Pethia rutila is a species of cyprinid fish found in the Aivapui River and Keisalam River in the Karnaphuli River drainage in Mizoram, India.

This species of fish can reach a length of  SL.

References 

Pethia
Fish described in 2014